The 24th Cuban National Series saw Pinar del Río's Vegueros win the title, outdistancing Camagüey by seven games. The Vegueros roster included the players Luis Giraldo Casanova, Omar Ajete and Omar Linares.

Standings

First division

Second division

Notes and references

Cuban National Series seasons
Base
Base
1985 in baseball